Aechmea lugoi is a species of plant in the family Bromeliaceae. It is endemic to the Pastaza region of Ecuador.  Its natural habitat is subtropical or tropical moist lowland forests. It is threatened by habitat loss.

References

Flora of Ecuador
lugoi
Vulnerable plants
Plants described in 1990
Taxonomy articles created by Polbot